The MacDonald Nunataks are two nunataks overlooking the head of the Ross Ice Shelf, Antarctica, standing just east of the terminus of Amundsen Glacier,  west of O'Brien Peak. They were mapped by the United States Geological Survey from surveys and U.S. Navy air photos, 1960–64, and were named by the Advisory Committee on Antarctic Names for John A. MacDonald, a biologist with the McMurdo Station winter party, 1964.

See also
Paradise Ridge

References

Nunataks of Antarctica
Amundsen Coast